Sylwia Karolina Grzeszczak (born 7 April 1989) is a Polish singer-songwriter and pianist currently signed to EMI Music Poland.

Discography

Studio albums

Singles

As featured artist

Awards and nominations

References

1989 births
Living people
Musicians from Poznań
Polish pop singers
Polish R&B singers
Polish lyricists
21st-century Polish singers
21st-century Polish women singers